Eben Everett Kurtz (born 12 November 1995) is an English former first-class cricketer.

Kurtz was born at Camden in November 1995. He was educated at Loughborough Grammar School, before going up to Durham University. While studying at Durham, he played two first-class cricket matches for Durham MCCU against Gloucestershire and Durham in 2016, scoring 36 runs in his two matches.

References

External links

1995 births
Living people
People from Camden Town
People educated at Loughborough Grammar School
Alumni of Durham University
English cricketers
Durham MCCU cricketers